Ayoub Kondo Bombwe, is a Tanzanian actor. He is notable for the roles in the films Bahasha and Fatuma. Apart from acting, he is also a screenplay writer, choreographer and director.

Career
He acted in two critically acclaimed films in 2018; Bahasha and Fatuma. For his role 'Mwanyusi' in Fatuma, Bombwe was nominated for the Best Actor in a Leading Role at Africa Movie Academy Awards (AMAA) in 2019.

Filmography

References

External links
 

Living people
Tanzanian male film actors
Year of birth missing (living people)